Atia or ATIA may refer to:

People
One of the spellings of the Arabic name Atiyah
Atia (gens), plebeian family of Rome
Atia (mother of Augustus) (85 BC – 43 BC), Roman noblewoman, daughter of Julius Caesar's sister Julia Caesaris, mother of the Emperor Augustus
Atia of the Julii, fictional character from the television series Rome, based on Atia the mother of Augustus

Others
Ouled Atia, town and commune in M'Sila Province, Algeria
Atia, Bulgaria, village in Burgas Province, Bulgaria
Assistive Technology Industry Association
Access to Information Act, a Canadian statute

See also
Atea (disambiguation)
Attea, a coastal town of ancient Mysia or of Aeolis
Attia
Attias
Atias
Atiyah